Botanical gardens in Ecuador have collections consisting entirely of Ecuador native and endemic species; most have a collection that include plants from around the world. There are botanical gardens and arboreta in all states and territories of Ecuador, most are administered by local governments, some are privately owned.
 	
Jardin Tropical de Esmeraldas, Esmeraldas 	
Fundacion Jardin Botanico de Guayaquil, Guayaquil 	
FInca Pastaza 	La Palmera 	Tungurahua
Jardin Botanico Reinaldo Espinosa, Loja 	
Jardín Botánico de la Universidad Técnica de Manabí, Portoviejo, Manabí
Jardin Botanico Las Orquideas, Puyo 	
Parque Pedagogico Etnobotanico OMAERE, Puyo, Pastaza
FundRAE - Reserva Etnobotánica Cumandá 	Quito 	
Quito Botanical Garden, Quito, Pichincha Province
Reserva Rio Guaycuyacu 	Quito 	
Timbre Botanic Garden Project 	Quito 	
Jardín Botánico Hacienda Verde 	Quito, Puéllaro, Pichincha Province
Jardín Botánico Yachay, Yachay University, Urcuqui, Imbabura
Jardín botánico La Carolina
Botanical Garden Atocha-La Liria, Ambato, Tungurahua Province

Herbarium collections
The Mazan Ecological Foundation was granted the  AZUA  initials to its herbarium by Botanic Gardens Conservation International (BGCI).

References 

Ecuador
Botanical gardens